Horst Köppel (born 17 May 1948) is a German football manager and former player who last worked as manager for FC Ingolstadt 04 in 2009.

Playing career
Köppel scored 83 goals in the West German top-flight.

For the West Germany national team he collected 11 caps.

Managerial career

Arminia Bielefeld
Köppel was manager of Arminia Bielefeld between 1 July 1982 and 30 June 1983.

Bayer 05 Uerdingen
Köppel was manager of Bayer 05 Uerdingen from 1 July 1987 to 1 December 1987. Köppel was replaced by Rolf Schafstall.

Borussia Dortmund
Köppel managed Borussia Dortmund from 1 July 1988 to 30 June 1991.

Fortuna Düsseldorf
Köppel managed Fortuna Düsseldorf from 26 March 1992 to 10 August 1992.

Tirol Innsbruck
Köppel managed Tirol Innsbruck from 1 July 1993 to 15 May 1994.

Urawa Red Diamonds
Köppel managed Urawa Red Diamonds from 1 February 1997 to 31 December 1997.

Borussia Dortmund II
Köppel officially took over as manager of Borussia Dortmund II on 1 July 2001. Köppel was manager until 30 June 2004 when he decided to join Borussia Mönchengladbach's reserve side.

Borussia Mönchengladbach
Köppel became manager of Borussia Mönchengladbach II on 1 July 2004. He became caretaker manager of Borussia Mönchengladbach on 27 October 2004. Dick Advocaat was hired as the new manager, ending Köppel's stint as caretaker manager, on 1 November 2004. Köppel returned to the reserve team on 2 November 2004. Köppel became manager of the senior squad after Advocaat resigned as manager of the club on 18 April 2005. Köppel was sacked on 16 May 2006.

Al-Wahda FC
Köppel became manager of Al-Wahda FC on 5 August 2006. Köppel was sacked on 11 October 2006.

Ingolstadt 04
Köppel became manager of Ingolstadt 04 on 27 April 2009. Köppel was sacked on 10 November 2009.

Managerial statistics

Honours

Player
 UEFA Euro 1972 winner
 European Cup runner-up: 1976–77
 UEFA Cup winner: 1974–75, 1978–79
 Bundesliga champion: 1969–70, 1970–71, 1974–75, 1975–76, 1976–77
 Bundesliga runner-up: 1973–74, 1977–78

Coach
 DFB-Pokal: 1988–89
 DFL-Supercup: 1989

References

External links
 
 
 
 

1948 births
Living people
Footballers from Stuttgart
German footballers
West German expatriate footballers
Germany international footballers
Germany B international footballers
Germany under-21 international footballers
UEFA Euro 1972 players
UEFA European Championship-winning players
Bundesliga players
VfB Stuttgart players
Borussia Mönchengladbach players
Vancouver Whitecaps (1974–1984) players
Expatriate soccer players in Canada
West German expatriate sportspeople in Canada
German expatriate sportspeople in Japan
North American Soccer League (1968–1984) players
German football managers
Arminia Bielefeld managers
KFC Uerdingen 05 managers
Borussia Dortmund managers
Fortuna Düsseldorf managers
Eintracht Frankfurt non-playing staff
J1 League managers
Urawa Red Diamonds managers
Expatriate football managers in Japan
Borussia Mönchengladbach managers
Bundesliga managers
FC Ingolstadt 04 managers
2. Bundesliga managers
3. Liga managers
UEFA Cup winning players
Borussia Dortmund II managers
Association football midfielders
Association football forwards
West German footballers
Al Wahda FC managers
Expatriate football managers in the United Arab Emirates
German expatriate sportspeople in the United Arab Emirates
Expatriate football managers in Austria
German expatriate sportspeople in Austria
Borussia Mönchengladbach non-playing staff
Borussia Dortmund non-playing staff
1. FC Köln non-playing staff
FC Tirol Innsbruck managers